In Brazil, an indigenous territory or indigenous land (TI) is an area inhabited and exclusively possessed by indigenous people. Article 231 of the Brazilian Constitution recognises the inalienable right of indigenous peoples to lands they "traditionally occupy" and automatically confers them permanent possession of these lands. In practice, however, a multi-stage demarcation process is required for a TI to gain full protection, and this has often entailed protracted legal battles. Even after demarcation, TIs are frequently subject to illegal invasions by settlers and mining and logging companies.

There are 724 proposed or approved indigenous territories in Brazil, covering about 13% of the country's land area. Critics of the system say that this is out of proportion with the number of indigenous people in Brazil, about 0.41% of the population; they argue that the amount of land reserved as TIs undermines the country's economic development and national security.

Distribution

, there were 702 indigenous territories in Brazil, covering 1,172,995 km2 – 14% of the country's land area. As of 2020, 120 areas were in the formal process of being identified, covering a total of 1,084,049 hectares; 43 had been formally identified (2,179,316 ha); 74 had been formally declared (7,305,639 ha) and 487 had already been formally approved (106,858,319 ha). This means that in total, 723 areas were either under evaluation or had been legally consolidated as indigenous territories, covering a total area of 117,427,323 hectares. For historical reasons—Portuguese colonisation started from the coast—most of these are concentrated in the country's interior, particularly Amazônia. There are only three federated units without any TIs: the states of Rio Grande do Norte and Piauí, and the Federal District.

Indigenous territories by state (2011)

History

Demarcation process
The process of demarcating indigenous territories was established in the 1973 Statute of the Indian and has been revised several times, most recently in 1996. Under the current legal framework, the initial identification and definition of potential TIs is the responsibility of FUNAI, the government body in charge of indigenous affairs, who commission an ethnographic and geographical survey of the area and publish a proposal. This proposal must then be approved by the Ministry of Justice, who consider FUNAI's proposal and any objections from other interested parties with respect to the Constitution. If approved, FUNAI begins physically demarcating the new TI and the National Institute for Colonization and Agrarian Reform undertakes the resettlement of any non-indigenous occupants. Final approval, or homologation, for the demarcation a TI is issued by the President of the Republic, after which it is officially registered.

The Statute of the Indian specified that all indigenous lands should be demarcated by 1978, and the 1988 Constitution also set a five-year deadline. However, demarcation is still ongoing. The process is frequently delayed by legal disputes arising from the objections of non-indigenous settlers and commercial interests in the proposed TI. This has been increasingly common since 1996, when a change in the law required an explicit period to be set aside in the demarcation process for the hearing of complaints. In 2008 the Supreme Federal Court issued a high-profile decision in favour of the continued territorial integrity of Raposa Serra do Sol in Roraima. Non-indigenous rice farmers had protested their deportation from the TI, arguing that the reserve undermined Brazil's national integrity and the state's economic development, and proposing that it be broken up. The ruling established a legal precedent that affected more than 100 similar cases that were before the Supreme Court at the time.

Criticism

Land ownership is a contentious issue in Brazil. In the 1990s, as much as 45% of the available farmland in the country was controlled by 1% of the population. Some advocates of land reform have therefore criticised the amount of land reserved for indigenous peoples, who make up just 0.2% of the national population. According to this view the 1988 Constitution's approach towards indigenous peoples' right to land is overly idealist, and a return to a more integrationist policy is favoured. In the Raposa Serra do Sol dispute, non-indigenous rice farmers and their advocates charged TIs with hindering economic development in sparsely populated states such as Roraima, where a large proportion of the land is reserved for indigenous peoples despite commercial pressures to develop it for agricultural use. Instituto Socioambiental, a Brazilian indigenous rights group, argue that the disparity between indigenous population and land ownership is justified because their traditional subsistence patterns (typically shifting cultivation or hunting and gathering) are more land extensive than modern agriculture, and because many TIs include large areas of agriculturally unproductive land or are environmentally degraded due to recent incursions.

Opponents of indigenous territories also claim that they undermine national sovereignty. The promotion of indigenous rights by NGOs is seen as reflecting an "internationalisation of the Amazon" which is contrary to Brazil's economic interests. Elements in the military have also expressed concern that because many TIs occupy border regions they pose a threat to national security – although both the army and police are allowed full access.

The current system of indigenous territories has also been criticised by proponents of indigenous rights, who say that the process of demarcation is too slow and that FUNAI lacks the resources to properly protect them from encroachment once registered.

See also 

 Indigenous peoples in Brazil
 List of indigenous peoples in Brazil

Notes

References

Indigenous peoples in Brazil
Indigenous topics of South America